Bruce Dwayne Perinchief (born 27 November 1960 in Paget, Bermuda) is a former Bermudian cricketer. He was a right-handed batsman and a leg-break bowler. He played three List A matches for Bermuda in the 1996 Red Stripe Bowl, and also played for them in the ICC Trophy in 1994 and 1997.

References
Cricket Archive profile
Cricinfo profile

1960 births
Living people
Bermudian cricketers
People from Paget Parish